O Brother, Where Art Thou? is the soundtrack album of music from the 2000 American film of the same name, written, directed and produced by the Coen Brothers and starring George Clooney, John Turturro, Tim Blake Nelson, and John Goodman.

The film is set in Mississippi during the Great Depression. The soundtrack, produced by T-Bone Burnett, uses bluegrass, country, gospel, blues, and Southern folk music appropriate to the time period. With the exception of a few vintage tracks (such as Harry McClintock's 1928 single "Big Rock Candy Mountain"), most tracks are modern recordings.

The soundtrack was reissued on August 23, 2011, with 14 new tracks that were not included in the original album, "including 12 previously unreleased cuts from music producer T-Bone Burnett's O Brother sessions."

Development and sound
The soundtrack was conceived as a major component of the film, not merely as a background or support. For this reason it was decided to record the soundtrack before filming. T-Bone Burnett and Alan Larman were invited to design collections of music.

Dirges and other macabre songs recurring in Appalachian music, such as "O Death", "Lonesome Valley", "Angel Band", and "I Am Weary", appear in the film as a contrast to the bright, cheerful songs like "Keep On the Sunnyside" and "In the Highways". Ralph Stanley of The Stanley Brothers personally recorded the a cappella folk song "O Death".

"I Am a Man of Constant Sorrow" has five variations: two are used in the film, one in the music video, and two in the album. Two of the variations feature the verses being sung back-to-back, and the other three variations feature additional music between each verse. The voices of the Soggy Bottom Boys were provided by Dan Tyminski (lead vocal on "I Am a Man of Constant Sorrow"), Nashville songwriter Harley Allen, and the Nashville Bluegrass Band's Pat Enright.

Reception and legacy

O Brother, Where Art Thou? won the Grammy Award for Album of the Year in 2002, the Grammy Award for Best Country Collaboration with Vocals (for singer Dan Tyminski, whose voice overdubbed George Clooney's in the film on "I Am a Man of Constant Sorrow", Nashville songwriter Harley Allen, and the Nashville Bluegrass Band's Pat Enright), and the Grammy Award for Best Male Country Vocal Performance for "O, Death" by Ralph Stanley.

The album won the Album of the Year Award (only the second soundtrack to ever do so) and Single of the Year Award for "I Am a Man of Constant Sorrow" at the Country Music Association Awards. It also won the Album of the Year Award at the 37th Academy of Country Music Awards and took home 2 International Bluegrass Music Awards: Album of the Year and Gospel Recorded Performance of the Year (for Alison Krauss and Gillian Welch on "I'll Fly Away").

In 2006, the album ranked No. 38 on CMT's 40 Greatest Albums in Country Music. In 2009, Rhapsody ranked it No. 8 on the "Country's Best Albums of the Decade" list. Engine 145 Country Music Blog ranked it No. 5 on the "Country's Best Albums of the Decade" list. In 2010, All Songs Considered, a program on NPR, included the soundtrack album on their list of "The Decade's 50 Most Important Recordings".

Some of the artists on the soundtrack album played a concert at the Ryman Auditorium in Nashville, Tennessee, which was recorded in the 2000 documentary film, Down from the Mountain.

On August 23, 2011, a 10th anniversary edition was released featuring a bonus disc with 14 new tracks that were not included in the original album, all but two of which were previously unreleased songs from Burnett's original sessions.

Commercial performance

The album charted at No. 1 on Billboard 200 In 2001, and spent over 20 weeks on the Billboard Top Country Albums Chart. The soundtrack CD became a best seller; it was first certified Gold by the RIAA on  February 9, 2001, and reached 8 times Platinum by October 10, 2007. It has sold 8,175,800 copies in the United States as of October 2019.

Track listing 

The 10th Anniversary bonus disc includes five songs that were used in the movie. The bonus disc versions of "You Are My Sunshine" and "I'll Fly Away" are the ones used in the film, not the versions on the original soundtrack. Both the original soundtrack and the bonus disc versions of "Hard Time Killing Floor Blues", "Keep on the Sunny Side", and "Angel Band" are used in the film.

The music credits for the movie list two songs, "Admiration" (written by William Tyers and performed by Pat Rebillo) and "What Is Sweeter" (written by M. K. Jerome), which are not included on either edition of the soundtrack.

Personnel 

Norman Blake – Performer, guitar, vocals
Jerry Douglas – Dobro
Alison Krauss – Vocals, harmony vocals
Chris Sharp – Rhythm guitar
The Stanley Brothers – Performers
Ralph Stanley – Performer
Sam Bush – Mandolin
Emmylou Harris – Performer
John Hartford – Fiddle, vocals
The Fairfield Four – Performer
Ed Haley – Arranger
The Whites:
Buck White – Mandolin, vocals, harmony vocals
Cheryl White – Bass, Vocals, harmony vocals
Sharon White – Guitar, vocals
Mike Compton – Guitar, mandolin
Alan Lomax – Arranger
Harley Allen – Vocals, harmony vocals
Barry Bales – Bass
Ron Block – Banjo
Curtis Burch – Dobro
T Bone Burnett – Arranger, producer
The Cox Family:
Evelyn Cox – Guitar
Sidney Cox – Banjo, vocals, harmony vocals
Suzanne Cox – Mandolin, vocals
Willard Cox – Vocals, harmony vocals
Stuart Duncan – Fiddle
Pat Enright – Vocals, harmony vocals, yodeling
Isaac Freeman – Bass, vocals, lead

James Hill – Vocals
Harry McClintock – Performer
Tim O'Brien – Vocals
Maura O'Connell – Vocals
Carter Stanley – Arranger
Dan Tyminski – Guitar, vocals
Wilson Waters – Tenor sax, vocals
Robert K. Oermann – Liner notes
Sam Phillips – Vocals
Gillian Welch – Arranger, vocals
Dub Cornett – Vocals
Chris Thomas King – Guitar, vocals
David Rawlings – Vocals
Gavin Lurssen – Mastering
Mike Piersante – Mixing
Peter Kurland – Location recording
First Baptist Church of Norfolk Choir – Vocals
Chris Sharp – Guitar
Nathaniel Best – Lead
Robert Hamlett – Vocals
Joseph Rice – Vocals
The Peasall Sisters
Sarah Peasall – Alto vocal, guitar, harmony vocals
Hannah Peasall – Soprano vocal, mandolin
Leah Peasall – Tenor vocal, violin, harmony vocals
The Soggy Bottom Boys – Performer
Tim Blake Nelson – Vocals, performer
Porter McClister – Tenor backup vocals
James Carter and The Prisoners – Performers
Alan Larman  – Musicologist

Chart performance

Weekly charts

Year-end charts

Certifications

See also 
 Down from the Mountain

References

External links 
 
 BBC News: O Brother, why art thou so popular?

2000 soundtrack albums
2000s film soundtrack albums
Country music soundtracks
Comedy-drama film soundtracks
Bluegrass albums
Albums produced by T Bone Burnett
Mercury Records soundtracks
Lost Highway Records soundtracks
Grammy Award for Album of the Year
Grammy Award for Best Compilation Soundtrack for Visual Media
Crime film soundtracks